Four-player chess (also known as four-handed chess) is a family of chess variants played with four people. The game features a special board typically made of a standard 8×8 square, with 3 rows of 8 cells each extending from each side, and requires two sets of differently colored pieces. The rules are similar to, but not the same as, regular chess. There are a variety of different rule variations; most variations, however, share a somewhat similar board and piece setup.

Variation of four-handed chess have been around for centuries. The modern game has been around for over 200 years, popping up in different places in Europe. Historically, the Four-Handed Chess Club, which was founded by George Hope Verney around 1884 in London, is the most well known iteration. Currently, it can be played online, or bought commercially to be played in person.

Gameplay can be in teams, typically with the two partners across from each other. It can also be free-for-all, with each of the players trying to gain a decisive advantage, with no set alliances. Free-for-all can be played for points, or till the first checkmate. Table-talk, such as move suggestions, is not allowed under the FFA rules; players must decide for themselves who, when, or how to attack.

Definition
According to D. B. Prichard, Four-player chess "is generally
understood to be a game played
with two sets on a standard board with four
extensions, one on each side, usually of 8x3
squares (arguably the best arrangement) but
sometimes 8x2 or 8x4, on which the pieces are
set up in the normal array positions."

History
The Taḥqīq mā li-l-hind min maqūlah maqbūlah fī al-ʿaql aw mardhūlah of al-Bīrūnī (973–1048), an encyclopaedia of Indian culture, contains a description of four-handed chess played with dice, which al-Bīrūnī claims was unknown among the Arabs of his time. Originally a four-sided rectangular die, later a six-sided cubic die, was rolled to determine which type of piece (king, bishop, knight, rook, pawn) was to be moved on a given turn. This version may have been played down to the 15th century. A version of the game without dice was still played in India in 1900, according to a contemporary article in the British Chess Magazine.

The earliest known mention of a Western four-player chess game is a pamphlet from Dessau, Germany, in 1784. Four-handed Chess, as it was called, grew in popularity throughout the 19th century, with variations of the game appearing in Germany, Britain, Russia, and the United States, among others. Many different pamphlets sprang up, with minor rule changes, such as where the king and queen were, or how to deal with pawns that ran into each other.

The biggest and most well known of the variations was the Four-handed Chess Club, founded by George Hope Loyd Verney. It began in 1884, in London. It was somewhat well known in London, and had eighty people attend its inaugural meeting. The club played until World War Two.

There are a few famous people who played, or are alleged, to play the game. George Hope Verney claimed that the Czar, probably Alexander III, played the game. Prince Albert is said to have played it. In addition, the game was likely played by Vladimir Lenin.

FFA is a more recent invention, popping up in commercial games, while teams is the game mode historically. Contemporarily, Four-player Chess is not particularly popular. Nevertheless, there are a few commercial versions for in-person play. It can also be played online, with the biggest website being Chess.com's variants.

Rules

Piece movement and captures remain the same as regular chess.

A board made of a standard 8×8 square with an additional 3 rows of 8 cells extending from each side is what is typically used for Four-player chess. Variants vary as to where the king and queen are placed; this doesn't matter for casual play. Otherwise, pieces are set up like regular chess.

Rules vary, in teams, as to how to deal with partners pawns when they run into each other. This happens sometimes because everybody moves in the forward direction, as in regular chess. When this happens for the Chess.com variant, the pawns are blocked, while some variants historically allowed pawns to jump over each other if this happened.

Players are of course free to change all rules to their convenience (see the rules section in the links tab for different variations of the rules).

Chess.com rules
Play starts with red, and turns are clockwise

Free For All (FFA)
The goal is to have the most points at the end of the game:

Pawns (and promoted pawns) are worth one point
A players queen is worth nine points
Bishops are worth five points
Rooks are also worth five points
Knights are worth three points
Checkmates (and in rare cases king captures) are worth twenty points.

Pawns promote to queens on the eight rank, which is at the middle of the board.

When a player is checkmated, all their pieces turn grey. When this happens, they cannot move and don't give a player any points. A player is checkmated immediately; in other words, they don't have to wait for their opponents to move to be checkmated.

The game ends when three players are defeated. It also ends when there are two players left and one player has more than twenty points more than the other player (because, if they were checkmated, they would still win) In this case, the leading player may have to click a button that says "claim win."

Trying to influence another player to help you by communicating in the chat (such as saying "team with me" or "take queen") is against the rules. However, it is perfectly legal to aid another players attacks, or choosing not to attack a player because you would think it would benefit you.

Teams
In teams, the goal is to checkmate one of the opposing players. You work with your opposite, and can suggest moves with arrows. This time, queen promotion is on the eleventh rank. On chess.com you functionally have two armies, you and your opposite, with the exception that you are the only one that can move your army, and vise-versa. Players are checkmated on their turn. This means that, theoretically, their opposite can block the checkmate, in some cases.

Modifications for in-person play
In FFA, if players don't wish to record points, they can alternatively play to the first person checkmated, or the last person standing. They can also, instead of playing for checkmate, make it so that a player instead has to capture the king, like any other piece.

In Teams, table-talk is historically not allowed in in-person play. Players can play until a player is checkmated, or they can make it so that both teammates need to be checkmated.

There are many different variations of these rules, including whether the board should be 8x2 or 8x3, or where the king and queen should be. Some historical variations allow the pawns to move in different directions, and some current rules remove checkmate, and instead require that the kings be captured.

Four-handed Chess Club rules
These are the major rules as adopted by the Four-handed Chess Club. This is somewhat quoted from the book 1893 book "Four Chess", which states the rules.

All laws of ordinary chess which are not contradicted by the following rules, hold also in four-handed chess.
A game is not won unless both opponents are checkmated or resign.
If one player is checkmated and the other stalemated, the game is drawn. If one player is stalemated and the other is free to move, the former simply loses his move and the game continues.
When one player is checkmated, the others continue to move in the same order as before, but he loses his move. His pieces merely occupy and block up the squares upon which they stand; they can neither be taken nor moved over so long as the mate continues. His opponents’ Kings can disregard the check of his pieces and even occupy an adjacent square to the mated King, as long as they do not allow the king to get out of check.
When a player is checkmated his partner may stop the mate by taking one of the mating pieces, inducing it to move, interposing one of his own pieces, or mating one of his opponents whose pieces are necessary to the checkmate. In the latter case he must mate with his pieces alone, since his partner's pieces are inert.
A checkmated player also regains the right to move if his opponents themselves raise the checkmate, and they can do so provided neither of their kings are in check of his pieces.
When the mate is relieved, the mated player's pieces at once become liable to capture and able to give check, and he resumes play as soon as his turn comes round.
No player can so move as to cause check to be given either to his own or to his partner's King; and if he cannot escape a check to his own King without causing check to his partner's, he is mated.
When a pawn is prevented from moving by one of the partner's pawns being on the square immediately in front of it, it can, as a move, hop over that pawn to the square behind it if that square be unoccupied.
A pawn becomes a Queen, or another piece at option of the player, when it reaches the back row of squares (i.e. the row originally occupied by the opponent's pieces) of one of the opponents.
When a pawn reaches the back row of their partner, their motion is reversed and is the same as that of their partner's pawns.

Strategy
For teams, players attempt to coordinate their attacks with their opposite. If this is not possible, then players should attempt to play strong moves, developing their pieces to premtively prevent typically double attacks from their opponents and put their pieces in strong positions to be able to coordinate attacks with their opposite. It is wise to play openings, such as (for the first player) moving the king's pawn up one, which shields against double-attacks, checks, and develop strong pieces.

In FFA, it is wise to be more cautious, developing pieces and improving kings safety. Trades should only be done when they are beneficial, because, when there are four people, this weakens the traders compared to the other players. Bishops are about as strong as rooks, and both are stronger than knights. The queen is the strongest piece. One should try to develop their pieces and protect their king. In addition, players should try to avoid opening themselves up to attacks. For example, if the player to the left attacks them, then the player across from them or the player to their right can attack them as-well, guaranteeing loss of material. Likewise, players should often look for ways to attack players that allow other players to join in.

See also

 Fortress chess
 Chaturaji

References

Bibliography
Note: Online formats (PDFs, Google Books) for some of these may be available.

External links
Play
 Chess.com Live Play
  Daily Games at greenchess.net

Rules 
 4-Way Chess rules of play
 Chess.com Rules
 Greenchess Rules
 FFA , Teams , Chess.com , WE Games rules videos

History 
 I IIIII at The Chess Variant Pages
 Four-handed Chess by Capt. George Hope Verney , The Chess Variant Pages
 Classified Encyclopedia (See Chapter 35)

Other 
 
 Current Manufacterers include House of Stauton, John N. Hansen, and WE Games

Chess variants
16th century in chess
1881 in chess